Pietra  is an Italian surname. Notable people with the surname include:

 Angelo Pietra (1550–1587), Italian Benedictine economist
 Gaetano Pietra (1879–1961), Italian statistician
 Minervino Pietra (born 1954), Portuguese footballer

See also
Pietra (disambiguation)
Pietro (disambiguation)
Pietri (surname)

Italian-language surnames